The Gap is a farming community in the central east part of the Riverina close to Wagga Wagga.

References 

Suburbs of Wagga Wagga